The 2015–16 Hertha BSC season is the 123rd season in club history.

Background

Background information

Hertha BSC finished the 2014–15 Bundesliga in fifteenth place, thus ensuring a place in the 2015–16 Bundesliga. It was confirmed on May 25, 2015, that Pál Dárdai will continue his role as Hertha's head coach for this season.

Transfers

In

Out

Friendlies

Bundesliga

League table

Results summary

Bundesliga fixtures & results

DFB-Pokal

Player information

|-
|colspan="10"|Players who left the club during the 2015–16 season
|-

|}

Notes

1.Kickoff time in Central European Time/Central European Summer Time.
2.Hertha BSC's goals first.

References

Hertha BSC
Hertha BSC seasons